Christian Schenk (born 9 February 1965 in Rostock, East Germany) is a former decathlete who competed for East Germany and Germany. He won the gold medal in the decathlon in the 1988 Summer Olympics, held in Seoul, South Korea.

Schenk also won a bronze medal at the 1991 World Championships in Athletics in Tokyo. He missed the 1992 Summer Olympics in Barcelona because of an injury and came fourth in the 1993 World Championships in Athletics in Stuttgart.

His personal best was 8500 points, achieved in August 1993 in Stuttgart. This ranks him ninth among German decathletes, behind Jürgen Hingsen, Uwe Freimuth, Siegfried Wentz, Frank Busemann, Torsten Voss, Guido Kratschmer, Paul Meier and Siegfried Stark. Schenk cleared  in the 1988 Seoul Olympics to share the World Decathlon Best in high jump with Rolf Beilschmidt, until the Canadian Olympic high jump gold medalist Derek Drouin improved the record by 1 centimeter in an decathlon competition in 2017. Schenk was noted for his use of the old-fashioned straddle technique, at a time when the Fosbury flop had become almost universal in competitive high jumping. He retired in 1994.

In August 2018 Schenk confessed that he had used chlorodehydromethyltestosterone during his career, his voluntary doping confession was greeted as a positive signal by the International Olympic Committee.

References

External links
 
 
 

1965 births
Living people
Sportspeople from Rostock
East German decathletes
Olympic gold medalists for East Germany
Athletes (track and field) at the 1988 Summer Olympics
Olympic athletes of East Germany
Medalists at the 1988 Summer Olympics
World Athletics Championships medalists
European Athletics Championships medalists
World Athletics Championships athletes for Germany
Olympic gold medalists in athletics (track and field)